This is a list of singles that have peaked in the Top 10 of the Billboard Hot 100 during 1986.

All #1 singles that had all top ten weeks in 1986 had either only six or seven weeks in the top ten. Janet Jackson scored four top ten hits during the year with "What Have You Done for Me Lately", "Nasty", "When I Think of You", and "Control", the most among all other artists.

Top-ten singles

1985 peaks

1987 peaks

References

General sources

Joel Whitburn Presents the Billboard Hot 100 Charts: The Eighties
Additional information obtained can be verified within Billboard's online archive services and print editions of the magazine.

See also
 1986 in music
 List of Hot 100 number-one singles of 1986 (U.S.)
 Billboard Year-End Hot 100 singles of 1986

1986
United States Hot 100 Top 10